Khlong Thom may refer to:
Khlong Thom, Bangkok (คลองถม), a neighbourhood in Bangkok
Khlong Thom District (คลองท่อม) in Krabi Province